An O-acylpseudotropine  is any derivative of pseudotropine in which the alcohol group is substituted with an acyl group.

Acylpseudotropines are formed by the action of the enzyme pseudotropine acyltransferase on pseudotropine.

See also
 Tropine
 Pseudotropine benzoate (tropacocaine)
 Atropine
 Tropinone

References

Tropanes
Carboxylate esters